The Zschampert is a river of Saxony, Germany. It flows into the Alte Luppe near Leipzig.

See also
List of rivers of Saxony

Rivers of Saxony
Rivers of Germany